Lyubavchikha is a rural locality (a village) in Velikodvorskoye Rural Settlement, Totemsky District, Vologda Oblast, Russia. The population was 5 as of 2002.

Geography 
Lyubavchikha is located 32 km southwest of Totma (the district's administrative centre) by road. Ustye is the nearest rural locality.

References 

Rural localities in Tarnogsky District